The drop bear (sometimes dropbear) is a hoax in contemporary Australian folklore featuring a predatory, carnivorous version of the koala. This imaginary animal is commonly spoken about in tall tales designed to scare tourists. While koalas are typically docile herbivores (and are not bears), drop bears are described as unusually large and vicious marsupials that inhabit treetops and attack unsuspecting people (or other prey) that walk beneath them by dropping onto their heads from above.

Origin 

The origin of the drop bear myth is unknown. The earliest written reference found by the National Library of Australia is a passing mention in a classified advertisement in the Canberra Times in 1982, but the term was in popular usage well before then, especially to scare scouts camping, or city tourists who came to visit the country.

Stories and tall tales
Stories about drop bears are generally used as an in-joke intended to frighten and confuse outsiders while amusing locals, similar to North American "fearsome critters" such as the jackalope. Tourists are the main targets of such stories. These tales are often accompanied by advice that the hearer adopt various tactics purported to deter drop bear attacks—including placing forks in the hair, having Vegemite or toothpaste spread behind the ears or in the armpits, urinating on oneself, and only speaking English in an Australian accent.

Popularisation
The website of the Australian Museum contains an entry for the drop bear written in a serious tone similar to entries for other, real, species. The entry classifies the Drop Bear as Thylarctos plummetus and describes them as "a large, arboreal, predatory marsupial related to the koala", the size of a leopard, having coarse orange fur with dark mottling, with powerful forearms for climbing and attacking prey, and a bite made using broad powerful premolars rather than canines. The tongue-in-cheek entry was created for "silly season". The Australian Museum also established a small display in the museum itself, exhibiting artefacts which it stated "may, or may not, relate to actual drop bears."

Australian Geographic ran an article on its website on 1 April 2013 (April Fools' Day) purporting that researchers had found that drop bears were more likely to attack tourists than people with Australian accents. The article was based on a 2012 paper published in Australian Geographer, and despite referencing the Australian Museum entry on drop bears in several places, images included with the Australian Geographic article were sourced from Australian Geographer and did not match the Australian Museum's species description.

The drop bear featured also in an advertisement for Bundaberg Rum. In the ad, Bundy Bear, the rum's (polar bear) mascot, is on a camping trip with a group of young men. As the men are sharing and opening cans of the rum, they notice a group of young female German tourists setting up a tent nearby. In an apparent attempt to win the women's attention, the men explain to them that they cannot camp there due to the presence of drop bears, and clumsily attempt to explain what a drop bear is. As the women show signs of knowing it is a hoax, the Bundy Bear drops from a tree above onto their tent, sending them screaming to the men's camp area. He gestures to one of the men from the ground, who acknowledges his support in winning the women's attention. The ad ends with the entire group, including the bear, sharing Bundaberg Rum at the men's campsite.

In the Discworld novel The Last Continent by Terry Pratchett, drop bears inhabit the continent of Fourecks, a land portrayed as a parody of Australia. This version of the drop bear tale sees the animals with well padded backsides to cushion their fall.

Australian Chris Toms and New Zealand musician Johnny Batchelor formed a band named "The Dropbears" in 1981.

See also 
 Garkain
 Hoop snake
 Pacific Northwest tree octopus
 Snipe hunt
 Yara-ma-yha-who
 Yowie

Notes

References

Australian legendary creatures
Australian humour
Fictional koalas
Hoaxes in Australia
In-jokes
Mythological marsupials
2013 hoaxes